Frank Pohlmann is a German-born, retired Karl Schmidt Unisia executive that is now serving his community as a Menominee City Council Alderperson, Chairman of the City of Menominee's Finance Committee, Marinette Marines Boys & Girls Soccer coach, along with participating in various other volunteer and charitable work.

Corporate career
 

Pohlmann served as President & CEO of Karl Schmidt Unisia for ten years and was responsible for Karl Schmidt Unisia's operations throughout the United States, Canada and Mexico. Prior to being president, Pohlmann was first the vice president of operations and later the company's CFO. Pohlmann worked for Kolbenschmidt Pierburg for a total of 18 years.

Political career
Pohlmann has been serving on the Menominee City Council since the Fall of 2010, when he was appointed, by the council, to fill the fourth ward seat vacated by a resignation. With his seat up for reelection in 2011, Pohlmann was then elected by popular vote, winning 74.6% of the votes cast.

Personal
Pohlmann holds a bachelor of engineering degree from the University of Hannover as well as a masters of public administration from American Public University.

Pohlmann's wife, DeeAnne Pohlmann, is currently a teacher at Lincoln Elementary School in the Menominee Area Public School District.

References 

1959 births
Living people
German chief executives
University of Hanover alumni
Michigan city council members